Boris Kravtsov (born 28 December 1922) is a Russian former jurist and politician who served as the justice minister of the Soviet Union between 1984 and 1989.

Biography
Kravtsov was born in Moscow on 28 December 1922. In 1941 he graduated from a high school and joined the Red Army. He was part of the Soviet military forces which liberated Ukraine from the Nazi invasion. In September 1945 Kravtsov began his studies at the Moscow Law School and graduated in 1947. Following his graduation he worked as a judge in different regions. He also graduated from the All Union Correspondence Law Institute in 1952. He was named the deputy prosecutor of the Russian Soviet Federative Socialist Republic (RSFSR) in 1960 and in 1971 he became the prosecutor of the RSFSR. On 12 April 1984 he was appointed minister of justice of the Soviet Union replacing Vladimir Terebilov in the post. Kravtsov was in office until 7 June 1989.

Kravtsov was the member of the Communist Party between 1943 and 1991. He served as a deputy at the Supreme Soviet in the 11th convocation from 1984 to 1989. He retired from public office in 1989.

Personal life

Kravtsov married Tatyana Ivanovna Kravtsova. He has two daughters.

Awards
For his activities in World War II Kravtsov was given the Gold Star of the Hero of the Soviet Union in May 1944. In February 2022, he was awarded the highest degree of the Order "For Merit to the Fatherland".

He also received the following awards:

 Order of Alexander Nevsky (26 December 2017)
 Order of Friendship of Peoples (7 April 1994)
 Order of Lenin (19 March 1944)
 Order of the October Revolution (27 December 1982)
 Orders of the Red Banner of Labour (25 October 1967; 31 August 1971)
 Order of the Patriotic War, 1st class (11 March 1985)

References

External links

20th-century jurists
1922 births
Living people
Politicians from Moscow
Communist Party of the Soviet Union members
Soviet Ministers of Justice
Heroes of the Soviet Union
Recipients of the Order "For Merit to the Fatherland", 1st class
Recipients of the Order of Alexander Nevsky
Recipients of the Order of Friendship of Peoples
Recipients of the Order of Lenin
Recipients of the Order of the Red Banner of Labour
Soviet military personnel of World War II
Members of the Supreme Soviet of Russia
Men centenarians
Russian centenarians
Soviet jurists